Kristian Lundin (born 7 May 1973) is a Swedish composer, music producer and songwriter.

Biography
Kristian's worked on the song "Quit Playing Games (with My Heart)" which he co-produced with Max Martin for the Backstreet Boys. He co-wrote & produced "Tearin' Up My Heart" for NSYNC as a follow-up.

Following the death of Denniz PoP, Kristian continued to work with fellow members of the Cheiron team, including Max Martin, Andreas Carlsson and Jake Schulze.  They wrote and produced "Bye Bye Bye" for NSYNC, "Born to Make You Happy" for Britney Spears, "That's the Way It Is" and "I'm Alive" for Celine Dion.

References

External links
 Interview, HitQuarters Jan 2003

1973 births
Living people
Swedish record producers
Swedish composers
Swedish male composers
Swedish songwriters